West Caledonia is a community in the Canadian province of Nova Scotia, located in  Queens County .

References
 West Caledonia on Destination Nova Scotia

Communities in Queens County, Nova Scotia
General Service Areas in Nova Scotia